Dmitrii Aleksandrov (born 12 September 1992) is a Kyrgyzstani swimmer, born in Bishkek. At the 2012 Summer Olympics, he competed in the men's 200 metre breaststroke, finishing in 32nd place overall in the heats, failing to qualify for the semifinals.

References

External links
 
 
 

1992 births
Living people
Sportspeople from Bishkek
Kyrgyzstani people of Russian descent
Kyrgyzstani male breaststroke swimmers
Olympic swimmers of Kyrgyzstan
Swimmers at the 2012 Summer Olympics
Swimmers at the 2010 Summer Youth Olympics
Asian Games competitors for Kyrgyzstan
Swimmers at the 2010 Asian Games
20th-century Kyrgyzstani people
21st-century Kyrgyzstani people